Glenn Coldenhoff (born 13 February 1991) is a Dutch professional motocross racer. He has competed in the Motocross World Championships since 2013. Coldenhoff was a member of the winning Dutch team at the 2019 Motocross des Nations event that included Jeffrey Herlings and Calvin Vlaanderen.

Motocross career
Coldenhoff was born in Oss on 13 February 1991. He lives in Heesch, Netherlands.

Coldenhoff in 2015 rode for the Suzuki racing team. He switched to the Red Bull KTM racing team for 2016. He won his first MXGP race on 12 July 2015 in Ķegums, Latvia. In Race 1 he finished first and in Race 2 he came in second after Romain Febvre. In December 2018 Coldenhoff crashed during a training session and broke his wrist and three vertebrae. In 2019 Coldenhoff won 2 rounds of world championships and with team Netherlands the 2019 Motocross des Nations.Their victory marked the first Dutch win in the 73-year history of the Motocross des Nations.

In 2019 Coldenhoff finished third in the 2019 FIM Motocross World Championship. In 2020 he stated he wanted to continue racing for another six years.

For the 2020 FIM Motocross World Championship Coldenhoff was part of the Gas Gas racing team. In the first round MXGP of Great Britain Coldenhoff finished sixth two times. On 8 March he finished seventh overall in the MXGP of The Netherlands, having finished ninth in the first race and seventh in the second race. Due to the COVID-19 pandemic the schedule of the championship was changed. For the third round the Gas Gas team used new bikes. On 9 August the MXGP of Latvia was held, in which Coldenhoff finished second in the first race and won the second race, finishing first overall. This was the first ever GP win of Gas Gas. During the MXGP of Riga on 12 August Coldenhoff finished seventh in the first race but bruised several ribs in the second race and did not finish. He had to drive the third round in Latvia (MXGP of Kegums) on pain killers.

On 16 October 2020 during the qualification for the MXGP of Flanders Coldenhoff fell and broke two vertebrae. The injury meant the end of the season for Coldenhoff.

Coldenhoff was released by Gas Gas following the 2020 season and signed with Monster Energy Yamaha Factory Facing on a two-year deal, partnering with Jeremy Seewer and Ben Watson and replacing 2015 MXGP champion Romain Febvre, who left for Kawasaki.

Motocross World Championship results

Races by year

(key) (Races in bold indicate pole position, races in italics indicate fastest lap)

 * Season still in progress.
Source:

References

External links
 Official website 

1991 births
Living people
Dutch motocross riders
Sportspeople from Oss
21st-century Dutch people